Zhao Xiu (1921–1992) original name Zhao Xinyou, was a People's Republic of China politician. He was born in Jingxing County, Shijiazhuang, Hebei Province. He was governor and People's Congress Chairman of Jilin Province.

1921 births
1992 deaths
People's Republic of China politicians from Hebei
Chinese Communist Party politicians from Hebei
Governors of Jilin
People from Shijiazhuang